An atmospheric pressure discharge is an electrical discharge in air at atmospheric pressure.

An electrical discharge is a plasma, which is an ionized gas. Plasmas are sustained if there is a continuous source of energy to maintain the required degree of ionization and overcome the recombination events that lead to extinction of the discharge. Recombination events are proportional to collisions between molecules and thus to the pressure of the gas. Atmospheric discharges are thus difficult to maintain as they require a large amount of energy.

Typical atmospheric discharges are:
 DC arc
 Lightning
 Atmospheric Pressure Glow Discharge (APGD)
 Dielectric Barrier Discharge (DBD)

See also
List of plasma (physics) articles

References

Plasma physics